Marsa Glacier is the 5 km long and 1.5 km wide glacier in Bangey Heights on the east side of the main ridge of north-central Sentinel Range in Ellsworth Mountains, Antarctica.  It is situated northeast of Patleyna Glacier and northwest of the head of Padala Glacier.  The glacier drains the north slopes of Golemani Peak, flows north-northwestwards between Oreshak Peak and Fucha Peak, and joins Embree Glacier west of Mount Schmid.

The glacier is named after the medieval settlement of Marsa in Southern Bulgaria.

Location
US mapping in 1961 and 1988.

See also
 List of glaciers in the Antarctic
 Glaciology

Maps
 Vinson Massif.  Scale 1:250 000 topographic map.  Reston, Virginia: US Geological Survey, 1988.
 Antarctic Digital Database (ADD). Scale 1:250000 topographic map of Antarctica. Scientific Committee on Antarctic Research (SCAR). Since 1993, regularly updated.

References
 Marsa Glacier SCAR Composite Gazetteer of Antarctica
 Bulgarian Antarctic Gazetteer. Antarctic Place-names Commission. (details in Bulgarian, basic data in English)

External links
 Marsa Glacier. Copernix satellite image

Glaciers of Ellsworth Land
Bulgaria and the Antarctic